David Cleghorn Thomson (9 October 1900 – 23 April 1980), was a Scottish journalist, author, poet, playwright, and Liberal and Labour Party politician. He was notably Director of the BBC's Scottish Region.

Background
Thomson was born in Edinburgh, the son of Dr John Thomson FRCPE and his wife, Isobel Macphail. The family lived at 14 Coates Crescent in Edinburgh's fashionable West End.

He was educated at Edinburgh Academy, the University of Edinburgh and Balliol College, Oxford.

Professional career
In 1923 Thomson was the Editor of Oxford Poetry, a literary magazine. From 1926 to 1933 he was Director of the BBC's Scottish Region.

In 1931 he was elected a Fellow of the Royal Society of Edinburgh. His proposers were Francis Albert Eley Crew, Robert Kerr Hannay, Sir James Walker and John (Ian) Bartholomew. He later resigned from the Society.

Political career
At the age of just 23, Thomson was Liberal candidate for the Willesden West division of Middlesex at the 1923 General Election. This was not a promising seat for a Liberal; no candidate had stood in 1922 and in 1918 the Liberal came third with less than 9%. Thomson was to also come third, but polled 18%. He returned to his native Edinburgh and was Liberal candidate for the Edinburgh South division at the 1924 General Election. At this election he was reputedly the Liberal Party's youngest candidate in Scotland. Edinburgh South was a Unionist seat that they had gained from the Liberals in 1918. In 1923 his predecessor as Liberal candidate had come within 2,500 votes of winning. This was a seat where the Labour Party had never run a candidate before, and they did not put up a candidate against Thomson. During the campaign, he expressed support for Scottish Home Rule, saying that 'he believed Scotland should have a Parliament of some sort in which to discuss matters purely concerning herself, but he was not in favour of the repeal of the Union'. With the national tide running against the Liberals, Thomson was well beaten and was only able to poll 36% of the vote.

Between 1918 and 1922 the Liberal Party had been split between those who supported the Coalition Government led by David Lloyd George and those who went into opposition, led by H. H. Asquith. The Liberals had re-united for the 1923 and 1924 elections. At the 1924 election, Asquith lost his seat but remained party leader. Lloyd George became Chairman of the Parliamentary Party. A section of the party who remained anti-Lloyd George formed themselves into a 'Radical Group' (sic) and Thomson was the group's first secretary. Despite his defeat in 1924, Thomson was sufficiently motivated to remain prospective Liberal candidate for Edinburgh South. However he resigned this position in 1926 when he became a Director at the BBC. His job at the BBC restricted his involvement in politics, so he did not contest the general elections of 1929 and 1931.

After he left the BBC, he returned to political activity, but this time with the Labour Party. He was Labour candidate for the Leith division of Edinburgh at the 1935 General Election. Leith had been a safe Liberal seat and the sitting member was a supporter of the National Government. Thomson was unable to gain the seat, though he did reduce the majority. He was then Labour candidate for the 1936 Combined Scottish Universities by-election. His National Government opponent on this occasion was former Labour Prime Minister Ramsay MacDonald. Labour candidates had always polled poorly in this University seat and Thomson was no different; he came third with only 12% of the vote. He was prospective Labour candidate for the West Renfrewshire division for the general election expected to take place in 1939/40. This had been a Labour seat until 1931 so his prospects for election were good. However, the outbreak of war postponed the election and by the time the election came along in 1945, the Labour Party had chosen another candidate who won the seat. He did not stand for parliament again.

Electoral record

References

1900 births
1980 deaths
Liberal Party (UK) parliamentary candidates
People educated at Edinburgh Academy
Alumni of the University of Edinburgh
Alumni of Balliol College, Oxford
Members of the Inner Temple
Labour Party (UK) parliamentary candidates